Richie Rich is a 1996 animated television series produced by Harvey Films and Film Roman and distributed by Claster Television. It is based on the Harvey Comics character of the same name.  It aired for one season, and also includes select Harveytoons shorts. Unlike the Hanna-Barbera version which depicted a somewhat older Richie closer to adolescence, this revival series was more faithful to the comics, as Richie Rich appeared in his original form as a younger child in his tuxedo and shorts.

Plot

Voices
 Katie Leigh – Richie Rich, Irona
 René Auberjonois – Richard Rich, Chef Pierre, Professor Keenbean
 Jeannie Elias – Tiny, Freckles, Reggie Van Dough, Gloria Glad
 Patrick Fraley – Dollar the Dog
 Martin Jarvis – Cadbury, Bascomb
 Susan Silo – Regina Rich

Crew
 Susan Blu – Voice Director

Episodes
13 episodes were produced:

 One of a Kind/Herman and Katnip: Will Do Mousework (1956)/Harvey Girls featuring Little Audrey: The Seapreme Court (1954, public domain) (aired on September 14, 1996)
 Nothing to Hiccup At/Harveytoons: Cat Tamale featuring Herman and Katnip (1952)/Harvey Girls featuring Little Audrey: Dawg Gone (1958) (aired on September 21, 1996)
 Richie's Great Race/Herman and Katnip: Of Mice and Menace (1954)/Harvey Girls featuring Little Audrey: The Case of the Cockeyed Canary (1952, Academy Award-submitted short) (aired on September 28, 1996)
 Girls Only/Herman and Katnip: Mice Capades (1952, Academy Award-submitted short)/Harvey Girls featuring Little Audrey: Dizzy Dishes (1954, Academy Award-submitted short) (aired on October 5, 1996)
 Rich and Chocolatey/Herman and Katnip: From Mad to Worse (1957)/Harvey Girls featuring Little Audrey: Audrey the Rainmaker (1951, banned cameo character, Aunt Petunia, cut) (aired on October 26, 1996)
 Richie's Circus/Herman and Katnip: Drinks on the Mouse (1953)/Harvey Girls featuring Little Audrey: Surf Bored (1953) (aired on October 12, 1996)
 Dognapped/Harveytoons: Mice Paradise featuring Herman (1951)/Harvey Girls featuring Little Audrey: Law and Audrey (1952) (aired on October 19, 1996)
 Back in the Saddle/Harveytoons: City Kitty (1952)/Harvey Girls featuring Little Audrey: Little Audrey Riding Hood (1955) (aired on November 2, 1996)
 Roughin' It (a.k.a. Pampered Campers)/Herman and Katnip: Mousier Herman (1955, Academy Award-submitted short)/Harvey Girls featuring Little Audrey: Fishing Tackler (1957) (aired on November 9, 1996)
 Bugged Out/Herman and Katnip: Mousestro Herman (1956, Academy Award-submitted short)/Modern Madcaps: T.V. Fuddlehead (1959, Academy Award-submitted short) (aired on November 16, 1996) 
 Invasion of the Cadbury Robots (a.k.a. Cadbury Overload)/Herman and Katnip: Felineous Assault (1959, Academy Award-submitted short)/Harveytoons: Feast and Furious featuring Finny (aired on November 23, 1996)
 The Love Potion/Harveytoons: Mice Meeting You featuring Herman (1950)/Harveytoons featuring Jolly the Clown (an updated Koko the Clown): Jolly the Clown (1957) (aired on November 30, 1996)
 Cleaned Out/Back in the Saddle (rerun)/Rich and Chocolatey (rerun) (aired on December 7, 1996)

Syndication
Minisodes of the show are available for streaming for free in the US on Sony owned Crackle.
In addition, all full-length episodes (except "Cleaned Out") are available to watch Amazon Video as The Richie Rich Collection.

References

External links
 
 

1996 American television series debuts
1996 American television series endings
1990s American animated television series
American children's animated comedy television series
American animated television spin-offs
Television shows based on Harvey Comics
First-run syndicated television programs in the United States
Television series by Film Roman
Richie Rich (comics)
Television series by Claster Television
Animated television series about children